Abu Sidrah is a village in northwest Qatar located in the municipality of Al-Shahaniya. According to the Ministry of Environment, there were about five households in the village in 2014.

It is accessible through Al Jemailiya Road. The settlements of Al Suwaihliya, to the north, and Al Jemailiya, to the south, are nearby.

Etymology
"Abu" in Arabic means "father", and is commonly used as a prefix for geographical features. The "sidrah" component refers to Ziziphus nummularia, a tree that frequently occurs around the rawda (depression) which the village is centered around.

Gallery

References

Populated places in Al-Shahaniya